Jacob Phillip "Silent Jake" Volz (April 4, 1878 – August 11, 1962) was a pitcher in Major League Baseball who played between 1901 and 1908 for the Boston Americans (1901), Boston Beaneaters (1905) and Cincinnati Reds (1908). He was born in San Antonio, Texas.
 
In a three-season career, Volz posted a 2–4 record with 12 strikeouts and a 6.10 ERA in 11 appearances, including seven starts, two complete games, and 38⅓ innings of work.

Volz married Anna (Cloud) Zuercher 1909 in San Antonio. On May 19, 1911, he shot Anna point blank in the face in front of their home while she was holding the hand of her five-year-old son from a prior marriage. He was subsequently found not guilty by reason of insanity.
 
Volz died in his hometown of San Antonio, Texas, at age 84.

References

External links

Retrosheet
Baseball Library

1878 births
1962 deaths
Boston Americans players
Boston Beaneaters players
Cincinnati Reds players
Major League Baseball pitchers
Baseball players from Texas
San Antonio Missionaries players
Austin Senators players
San Antonio Bronchos players
Portsmouth Browns players
Indianapolis Indians players
St. Paul Saints (AA) players
Lawrence Colts players
Sioux City Packers players
Holyoke Paperweights players
Bridgeport Orators players
Hartford Senators players
Columbia Gamecocks players
Norfolk Tars players